The encirclement campaign against Hunan-Hubei-Sichuan-Guizhou Soviet was a series of battles launched by the Chinese Nationalist Government that was intended to destroy communist Hunan-Hubei-Sichuan-Guizhou Soviet and its Chinese Red Army in the local region.  It was responded by the Communists'  Counter-encirclement campaign at Hunan-Hubei-Sichuan-Guizhou Soviet, also called by the communists as the Counter-encirclement campaign at Hunan-Hubei-Sichuan-Guizhou Revolutionary Base, in which the local Chinese Red Army successfully defended their soviet republic in the southern Jiangxi province against the Nationalist attacks from February, 1935 to August, 1935.

See also
List of battles of the Chinese Civil War
National Revolutionary Army
History of the People's Liberation Army
Chinese Civil War

Campaigns of the Chinese Civil War
1935 in China